Leston is both a surname and a given name. Notable people with the name include:

Surname
Dennis Leston (1917–1981), English entomologist
Les Leston (1920–2012), British racing driver

Given name
Leston Havens (1924–2011), American psychiatrist, psychotherapist and medical educator
Leston Júnior (born 1978), Brazilian football manager
Leston Paul (born 1990), Trinidad and Tobago footballer